Peter Bach (born 14 April 1966) is an Australian handball player. He competed in the men's tournament at the 2000 Summer Olympics.

Bach's wife, Janni, also played handball for Australia. Their son, Rasmus, is a professional basketball player.

References

External links
 

1966 births
Living people
Australian male handball players
Olympic handball players of Australia
Handball players at the 2000 Summer Olympics
Sportspeople from Frederiksberg